Vila da Penha is a neighborhood in the North Zone of Rio de Janeiro, Brazil. It is a mostly residential neighborhood.

References

Neighbourhoods in Rio de Janeiro (city)